The first season of the Attack on Titan anime television series was produced by IG Port's Wit Studio and directed by Tetsurō Araki, with Yasuko Kobayashi handling series composition and Kyōji Asano providing character designs. It covers the first story arcs (chapters 1–34) from the original manga by Hajime Isayama. Attack on Titan is set in a world where humanity lives inside cities surrounded by enormous walls due to the Titans, gigantic humanoid beings who devour humans. The story follows the adventures of Eren Jaeger and his childhood friends Mikasa Ackerman and Armin Arlert, whose lives are changed forever after a Colossal Titan breaches the wall of their home town. Vowing revenge and to reclaim the world from the Titans, Eren and his friends join the Scout Regiment, an elite group of soldiers who fight Titans.

The season was broadcast on MBS TV from April 7 to September 29, 2013 and later aired on Tokyo MX, FBS, TOS, HTB, TV Aichi and BS11. Both Funimation and Crunchyroll have streamed the series with subtitles on their respective websites. Funimation has also licensed the anime for home video release in 2014. Episode 1 of Funimation's English dubbed version premiered at Anime Boston, with other episodes put on Funimation's subscription services. In the United States, the dub of the series was broadcast weekly on Adult Swim's Toonami programming block starting on May 3, 2014 at 11:30 p.m. EDT.

The score is composed by Hiroyuki Sawano. For the rest of the season, the opening theme is  also by Linked Horizon and the ending theme is "Great Escape" by Cinema Staff. The opening themes were collected on Linked Horizon's single "Jiyū e no Shingeki" which sold over 100,000 copies in its first week of sales.

The season received critical acclaim from critics, and audiences, praising it for its voice work, animation, music, direction, dark tone, writing; especially for its action sequences and plot twists.



Episode list

Music

The series' soundtrack was composed by Hiroyuki Sawano, and the first CD was released on June 28, 2013, by Pony Canyon. The first CD contains 16 tracks, with 6 vocal tracks featuring performances by Aimee Blackschleger, CASG (Caramel Apple Sound Gadget), Cyua, Mika Kobayashi and mpi. The second CD containing the other half of the soundtrack was released on October 16, 2013, as a bonus offered with the fourth Blu-ray and DVD limited edition volumes of the anime.

Track listing

Home media release

Japanese

English

References

External links
  

Attack on Titan episode lists
2013 Japanese television seasons